Compagni di scuola is a 1988 Italian comedy film directed by and starring Carlo Verdone. It was shown as part of a retrospective on Italian comedy at the 67th Venice International Film Festival.

Plot
Federica is a 35 years old a kept woman. She decides to organize a reunion with her high school classmates, 15 years after graduation.

They gather at her villa and begin to recall cheerfully the years at school, and their life afterward. However, for many of them this has been disappointing, and for many the regrets and dissatisfaction quickly emerge and turn the encounter into a melancholic or even tragic experience. Some attempt to forcefully recreate the atmosphere of their youth, a failed singer tries to exploit the occasion to make some money, another one who had successfully pursued a career in politics will end up raping the young lover of one of his old classmates. In the morning, the guests leave and return to their life, although for some the event has been a turning point.

Cast
Carlo Verdone: Piero Ruffolo
Nancy Brilli: Federica Polidori
Christian De Sica: Bruno Ciardulli
Angelo Bernabucci: Walter Finocchiaro
Massimo Ghini: Mauro Valenzani
Eleonora Giorgi: Valeria Donati
Athina Cenci: Maria Rita Amoroso
Natasha Hovey: Cristina
Maurizio Ferrini: Armando Lepore
Alessandro Benvenuti: Lino Santolamazza
Fabio Traversa: Piermaria Fabris
Luigi Petrucci: Ottavio Postiglione
Piero Natoli: Luca Guglielmi
Luisa Maneri: Gloria Montanari
Isa Gallinelli: Jolanda Scarpellini
Giusi Cataldo: Margherita Serafini
Gianluca Favilla: Margherita's husband
Giovanni Vettorazzo: Francesco Toscani
Carmela Vincenti: Gioia Savastano
Silvio Vannucci: Giulio Attenni
Gianni Musy: Piero's father in law

References

External links

1988 films
1988 comedy films
1980s Italian-language films
Italian comedy films
Films directed by Carlo Verdone
Films set in Rome
1980s Italian films